Aneplasa is a genus of African ground spiders that was first described by R. W. E. Tucker in 1923, but might actually be a junior synonym of Nomisia.

Species
 it contains eight species found in South Africa, East Africa, or Angola:
Aneplasa balnearia Tucker, 1923 (type) – South Africa
Aneplasa borlei Lessert, 1933 – Angola
Aneplasa facies Tucker, 1923 – South Africa
Aneplasa interrogationis Tucker, 1923 – South Africa
Aneplasa nigra Tucker, 1923 – South Africa
Aneplasa primaris Tucker, 1923 – South Africa
Aneplasa sculpturata Tucker, 1923 – South Africa
Aneplasa strandi Caporiacco, 1947 – East Africa

References

Araneomorphae genera
Gnaphosidae
Spiders of Africa